Hexoplon bellulum is a species of beetle in the family Cerambycidae. It was described by Galileo and Martins in 2010.

References

Hexoplonini
Beetles described in 2010